4 Tha Hard Way is West Coast hip hop artist Rappin' 4-Tay's fourth album, released by Virgin Records in 1997. The album features production from Bay Area producer Ant Banks, as well as guest appearances from the likes of Tupac Shakur, Rick James, E-40 and Master P. The entire album is dedicated to the memory of Tupac Shakur.

Allmusic noted the album's "positive and congenial tone" and tendency towards "melodic, R&B-flavored tracks", concluding that it was "decent, but not remarkable".

Track listing

References

External links 
 4 Tha Hard Way at Discogs
 4 Tha Hard Way at Tower Records

Rappin' 4-Tay albums
1997 albums
Albums produced by Ant Banks
Albums produced by Studio Ton